Robert Ivan Woytowich (August 18, 1941 – July 30, 1988) was a Canadian ice hockey defenceman. He played for  the National Hockey League from 1964 to 1972, and in the World Hockey Association from 1972 to 1976.

Playing career
Woytowich started his National Hockey League career with the Boston Bruins in 1964. He would also play for the Minnesota North Stars, Pittsburgh Penguins, and Los Angeles Kings. He left for World Hockey Association after the 1972 season.  He would play for the Winnipeg Jets and Indianapolis Racers.

During Woytowich's tenure in Pittsburgh, he became a favorite of fans who formed a fan club called Woytowich's Polish Army (Woytowich was of Polish descent).  The club camped in the upper reaches of the Pittsburgh Civic Arena during weekday home games and filled an entire section during Saturday home games.  Despite its name, one did not have to be of Polish descent to be a member of the Polish Army.  Members had to have the money to purchase a general admission ticket and were forbidden from saying anything nice about Penguins opponents.

On July 30, 1988, Woytowich suffered a heart attack while driving his car near Winnipeg.  The car was involved in an accident and he died.

Awards and achievements
CPHL First All-Star Team (1964)
Played in NHL All-Star Game (1970)
Honoured Member of the Manitoba Hockey Hall of Fame.

Career statistics

Regular season and playoffs

External links
 

1941 births
1988 deaths
Boston Bruins players
Brandon Wheat Kings players
Canadian ice hockey defencemen
Hershey Bears players
Ice hockey people from Winnipeg
Indianapolis Racers players
Los Angeles Kings players
Minnesota North Stars players
Mohawk Valley Comets (NAHL) players
North American Hockey League (1973–1977) coaches
Pittsburgh Penguins players
Seattle Totems (WHL) players
St. Paul Rangers players
Sudbury Wolves (EPHL) players
Winnipeg Jets (WHA) players
Winnipeg Rangers players